Executive Office Building may refer to:
Eisenhower Executive Office Building (formerly Old Executive Office Building), a U.S. government office building situated just west of the White House in Washington, D.C., occupied by the Executive Office of the President
New Executive Office Building, a U.S. government office building on the north side of Pennsylvania Avenue, across from the Eisenhower Executive Office Building
Executive Office Building (St. Louis, Missouri), listed on the NRHP in Missouri
Executive Office Building, $10-million structure erected at Utulei, American Samoa in 1991